Rewe may refer to:

Rewe, Devon, a village in Devon, England
REWE, a German supermarket chain
REWE Group, a diversified group of retail and tourism businesses, whose holdings include the German supermarket chain
Rehue, an altar used by the Mapuche of Chile

See also
Rew (disambiguation)
Roo (disambiguation)
Ru (disambiguation)
Rue (disambiguation)